The 2015–16 Baltimore Blast season is the twenty-fourth season of the Baltimore Blast professional indoor soccer club. The Blast, an Eastern Division team in the Major Arena Soccer League, play their home games at Royal Farms Arena in downtown Baltimore, Maryland.

The team is led by owner Edwin F. Hale, Sr. and head coach Danny Kelly. Following a 10-5 victory on February 15 over the Chicago Mustangs, Baltimore clinched first place in the Eastern Division and the top seed in the Divisional Final.

The Blast finished the regular season 15-4 and went undefeated in the postseason, winning four of their six playoff games in overtime, en route to the team's eighth championship. Pat Healey won his second consecutive Defender of the Year award while Lucas Roque received the MASL Finals MVP.

History
Launched in July 1992 as the Baltimore Spirit, an expansion team in the second National Professional Soccer League for the 1992–93 season, the team replaced the original Baltimore Blast which folded earlier in 1992 when the first Major Indoor Soccer League shut down. Ed Hale, an owner of the original Blast, bought the Spirit in July 1998 and changed the name to Baltimore Blast. In 2001, the team was a founding member of the second MISL. When that league shut down in 2008, they co-founded the National Indoor Soccer League which, one season later, became the third MISL.

After the 2013-14 season, Baltimore was one of three teams that left the MISL, leading to the league's collapse. Along with five other former MISL teams, the Blast joined the teams of the Professional Arena Soccer League, which was soon rebranded as the Major Arena Soccer League. With the Rochester Lancers folding and the failed launch of Hartford City FC, the MASL Eastern Division for the 2015-16 season consists of former MISL club Syracuse Silver Knights, plus former PASL clubs Waza Flo and Harrisburg Heat.

Off-field moves
All MASL games are now scored with traditional soccer scoring where every goal is worth one point.

Schedule

Regular season

Post-season

.

Personnel

Team roster
As of January 15, 2016

Staff
The team's coaching staff includes head coach Danny Kelly, assistant coach David Bascome, athletic trainer Heather Kohlbus, physical therapist Paul Ernst, team doctor Dr. Richard Levine, and equipment manager Mark Meszaros. The Blast front office includes owner Edwin F. Hale, Sr., team president and general manager Kevin Healey, assistant general manager Mike Conway, director of ticket operations Jason Carrick, and marketing coordinator Stephen Cooke.

Statistics

Top scorers
Last updated on October 18, 2016. Source:

References

External links
Baltimore Blast official website
Baltimore Blast at The Baltimore Sun

Baltimore Blast
Baltimore Blast
Baltimore Blast 2015
Baltimore Blast 2015
Baltimore Blast 2015